The 2003 Banquet 400 presented by ConAgra Foods was the 30th stock car race of the 2003 NASCAR Winston Cup Series season and the third iteration of the event. The race was held on Sunday, October 5, 2003, before a crowd of 80,000 in Kansas City, Kansas, at Kansas Speedway, a 1.5 miles (2.4 km) permanent D-shaped oval racetrack. The race took the scheduled 267 laps to complete. At race's end, a cunning pit strategy for Penske Racing South driver Ryan Newman would propel him to his ninth career NASCAR Winston Cup Series win and his eighth win of the season. To fill out the podium, Bill Elliott and Jeremy Mayfield of Evernham Motorsports would finish second and third, respectively.

Background 

Kansas Speedway is a 1.5-mile (2.4 km) tri-oval race track in Kansas City, Kansas. It was built in 2001 and hosts two annual NASCAR race weekends. The NTT IndyCar Series also raced there until 2011. The speedway is owned and operated by the International Speedway Corporation.

Entry list

Practice

First practice 
The first practice session was held on Friday, October 3, at 11:20 AM CST, and would last for 2 hours.

Second practice 
The second practice session was held on Saturday, October 4, at 9:30 AM CST, and would last for 45 minutes.

Third and final practice 
The third and final practice session, sometimes referred to as Happy Hour, was held on Saturday, October 4, at 11:10 AM CST, and would last for 45 minutes.

Qualifying 
Qualifying was held on Friday, October 3, at 1:05 PM CST. Each driver would have two laps to set a fastest time; the fastest of the two would count as their official qualifying lap. Positions 1-36 would be decided on time, while positions 37-43 would be based on provisionals. Six spots are awarded by the use of provisionals based on owner's points. The seventh is awarded to a past champion who has not otherwise qualified for the race. If no past champ needs the provisional, the next team in the owner points will be awarded a provisional.

Two drivers would fail to qualify: Larry Foyt and Johnny Sauter.

Full qualifying results

Race results

References 

2003 NASCAR Winston Cup Series
NASCAR races at Kansas Speedway
October 2003 sports events in the United States
2003 in sports in Kansas